Makhlouf is both a surname and a given name. Notable people with the name include:

People with the surname
Anas Makhlouf (born 1973), Syrian footballer
Anisa Makhlouf (1930–2016), First Lady of Syria
Charbel Makhlouf (1828–1898), Lebanese Maronite monk and priest
Georgia Makhlouf, Lebanese writer 
Hafez Makhlouf (born 1971), Syrian intelligence officer
Hamdi Makhlouf (born 1980), Tunisian musician
Hussein Makhlouf (born 1964), Syrian politician
Issa Makhlouf, Lebanese writer and poet
Mohammed Makhlouf, Syrian businessman
Rami Makhlouf (born 1969), Syrian businessman
Tal Makhlouf (born 1991), Israeli footballer

People with the given name
Makhlouf Eldaoudi (1825–1909), Ottoman rabbi
Makhlouf Naït Rabah (born 1996), Algerian footballer

See also
Maklouf